Olivetta San Michele (Royasc: , also ) is a comune (municipality) in the Province of Imperia in the Italian region Liguria, located about  southwest of Genoa and about  west of Imperia, on the border with France.

Geography
Olivetta San Michele borders the following municipalities: Airole, Breil-sur-Roya (France), Castellar (France), and Ventimiglia.

Demographic evolution

References

External links

Cities and towns in Liguria